Raymond Leroy Coleman (June 4, 1922 – September 19, 2010) was an American professional baseball outfielder who appeared in 559 career games over five seasons in Major League Baseball between  and  for the St. Louis Browns (over three separate stints), Philadelphia Athletics and Chicago White Sox.

Signed by the Browns as an amateur free agent in 1940 out of Yreka High School, Coleman played 14 seasons of professional baseball until his 1956 retirement, missing the 1943 through 1945 campaigns while serving in the United States Navy in the Mediterranean and Pacific theaters of operation of World War II. He made his major league debut in 1947. He compiled 146 hits with 76 runs driven in during the 1951 season.

Overall, Coleman batted .258 as a major leaguer; his 446 career hits included 73 doubles, 20 triples, 33 home runs and 199 RBI. After his third term as a member of the Browns in 1952, St. Louis sent him to the Brooklyn Dodgers' organization as part payment for shortstop Billy Hunter, and he played four more seasons in the minor leagues before leaving the game.

A retired bookkeeper, Ray Coleman died September 19, 2010, at age 88.

References

External links
 http://www.baseballinwartime.com/player_biographies/coleman_ray.htm

Sources

1922 births
2010 deaths
Baseball players from California
Birmingham Barons players
Buffalo Bisons (minor league) players
Chicago White Sox players
Fort Worth Cats players
Havana Sugar Kings players
Major League Baseball outfielders
Mayfield Browns players
Mayfield Clothiers players
Mobile Bears players
Omaha Cardinals players
Paragould Browns players
People from Dunsmuir, California
Philadelphia Athletics players
St. Louis Browns players
St. Paul Saints (AA) players
San Antonio Missions players
Springfield Browns players
United States Navy personnel of World War II
Yreka High School alumni
American expatriate baseball players in Cuba